Mark Sayers (born 1 May 1947) is a former New Zealand rugby union player. A second five-eighth, Sayers represented Wellington at a provincial level, and was a member of the New Zealand national side, the All Blacks, from 1972 to 1973. He played 15 matches for the All Blacks but did not appear in any internationals.

References

1947 births
Living people
Rugby union players from Wellington City
People educated at Wellington College (New Zealand)
Victoria University of Wellington alumni
New Zealand rugby union players
New Zealand international rugby union players
Wellington rugby union players
Rugby union centres